Ashley Gable is an American screenwriter and producer who has worked on a variety of well-known television series including Buffy the Vampire Slayer and Person of Interest. She was an executive producer on the CBS crime drama The Mentalist for its first four seasons.

Career
Gable's television career began in 1996 when she was recruited onto the writing staff of the first season  of Joss Whedon's Buffy the Vampire Slayer. She (and her then-writing partner Thomas A. Swyden) wrote two of the twelve episodes for the season.

Gable has worked on a number of other shows as a writer and producer, including The Invisible Man, Family Law, The Division, Strong Medicine, Crossing Jordan, New Amsterdam and Vegas. In 2008 she was hired to work on The Mentalist as a co-executive producer under creator Bruno Heller and became an executive producer.  She left that show after four seasons and subsequently served as co-executive producer on the CBS drama series Person of Interest.

In 2019, Gable joined other WGA members in firing her agents as part of the Guild's stand against the ATA after the two sides were unable to come to an agreement on a new "Code of Conduct" that addressed the practice of packaging.

Filmography

Buffy the Vampire Slayer episodes
 1.08 "I, Robot... You, Jane"
 1.11 "Out of Mind, Out of Sight"

The Mentalist episodes
 1.03 "Red Tide"
 1.09 "Flame Red"
 1.18 "Russet Potatoes"
 2.03 "Red Badge"
 2.08 "His Red Right Hand"
 2.19 "Blood Money"
 3.02 "Cackle-Bladder Blood"
 3.07 "Red Hot"
 3.23 "Strawberries and Cream (Part 1)"
 4.03 "Pretty Red Balloon"
 4.11 "Always Bet on Red"
 4.22 "So Long, And Thanks for All the Red Snapper"

References

External links
 

American television writers
American television producers
American women television producers
Living people
American women television writers
Place of birth missing (living people)
Year of birth missing (living people)
21st-century American women